Northern Sotho, or  as an endonym, is a Sotho-Tswana language spoken in the northeastern provinces of South Africa.

According to the South African National Census of 2011, it is the first language of over 4.6 million (9.1%) people, making it the 5th most spoken language in South Africa. The Sepedi language is spoken most commonly in Mpumalanga, Gauteng and the Limpopo provinces.

Name

The Northern Sotho written language was based largely on the Sepedi dialect.  Missionaries studied this dialect the most closely and first developed the orthography in 1860 by Alexander Merensky, Grutzner and Gerlachshoop.  This subsequently provided a common writing system for 20 or more varieties of the Sotho-Tswana languages spoken in the former Transvaal, and also helped lead to "Sepedi" being used as the umbrella term for the entire language family.  However, there are objections to this synecdoche by other Northern Sotho dialect speakers, such as speakers of the Modjadji's Lobedu dialect.

Other varieties of Northern Sotho

Northern Sotho can be subdivided into Highveld-Sotho, which consists of comparatively recent immigrants mostly from the west and southwest parts of South Africa, and Lowveld-Sotho, which consists of a combination of immigrants from the north of South Africa and Sotho inhabitants of longer standing. Like other Sotho-Tswana people their languages are named after totemic animals and, sometimes, by alternating or combining these with the names of famous chiefs.

The Highveld-Sotho

The group consists of the following dialects:
Bapedi 
Bapedi Marota (in the narrower sense)
Marota Mamone
Marota Mohlaletsi
Batau Bapedi (Matlebjane, Masemola, Marishane, Batau ba Manganeng - Nkadimeng Kgaphola, Nchabeleng, Mogashoa, Phaahla, Sloane, Mashegoana, Mphanama)
Phokwane
Bakone
Kone (Ga-Matlala)
Dikgale
Baphuthi
Baroka
Bakgaga (Mphahlele, Maake, Mothapo)
Chuene
Mathabatha
Maserumule
Tlou (Ga-Molepo)
Thobejane (Ga-Mafefe)
Batlokwa, 
Batlokwa Ba Lethebe
Makgoba
Batlou
Bahananwa (Ga-Mmalebogo)
Moremi
Motlhatlhana
Babirwa
Mmamabolo
Bamongatane
Bakwena ba Moletjie (Moloto)
Batlhaloga
Bamohlala/ Ba Ga Mohlala, Banareng, Ba Hwaduba Ba Ga Magale and many others.

The Lowveld-Sotho

The group consists of the Lobedu, Narene, Phalaborwa (Malatji), Mogoboya, Kone, Kgaga, Pulana, Pai, and Kutswe.

History 

Before Moshoeshoe and his Basotho nation of Lesotho, the Basotho people were there. Moshoeshoe didn't found Basotho, but he founded a country made up of Sesotho-speaking people from different Sesotho-speaking clans in which the British imperialist in Southern Africa erroneously called the Basotho nation cutting them off from the rest of other Basothos outside Lesotho in the Orange Free State and Transvaal in present-day South Africa, Botswana as if Moshoeshoe and his people were unique from other Basotho people. Basotho people were there before Moshoeshoe, the son of Mokhachane of another Basotho clan of the Bamokoteli clan, united the smaller and vulnerable families of Basothos under his Bakwena clan leadership during the Shaka wars of difaqane after other Basothos have migrated to different directions from their cradle in Ntswanatsatsi. Moshoshoe, his Bakwena clan, and the other Basotho clan originate from Ntswanatsatsi in present-day South Africa. Families moved away from each other in Ntswanatsatsi. They started clans using a totem as a symbol of their line (like a crocodile (Koena) which Moshoshoe's ancestors used), and different families moved to different directions within pre-colonial South Africa under different leadership. Under different leadership, some settled in the Western side, present-day North West Province others spread around Ntswanatsatsi to the present-day Free State and Lesotho; others to present-day Botswana others to present-day Zambia, others moved to the present-day Gauteng in South Africa, and they became patriarchs of the founding fathers of Bakgatla, which also gave birth to Northern Sotho, which, in turn, gave birth to different Northern clans with their dialects like BaPedi, Batlokwa, Babirwa, etc. and others ended up in inter-marrying with other tribes. They moved next to and mingled with like Swatis, Vendas, Tsongas and Ngunis, and, in some places, these Northern Basotho' Sotho was diluted by the influence of these tribe they found in the area they moved into and lived alongside. This happened to a Northern Basotho subgroup who ended up becoming Mapulana with their Sesotho influenced by Swati. Also, some of the Northern Basotho have a common denominator of "apa" (meaning talk) with Vendas, I mean Balovedu, BaGubu and Babirwa of Bobirwa in the Southern part of Botswana near the Zimbabwean border. All these Northern Sotho clans had their chief leader, but they never had a paramount king, so it would be absurd to call them BaPedi because the BaPedi kings had never been their kings. They did their things from Ramokgopha of Batlhokwa, Malatji of Phalaborwa, Malebogo of Bahanawa, Matlala, etc., and they were never part of the Pedi kingdom.

Classification

Northern Sotho is one of the Sotho languages of the Bantu family.

Although Northern Sotho shares the name Sotho with Southern Sotho, the two groups have less in common with each other than they have with Setswana.

Northern Sotho is also closely related to Setswana, sheKgalagari and siLozi. It is a standardised dialect, amalgamating several distinct varieties or dialects.

Most Khelobedu speakers only learn to speak Sepedi at school, as such Sepedi is only a second or third language and foreign to them like English and Afrikaans. Khelobedu is a written language. Khilovedu dictionary, THALUSAMANDWI YA KHILOVEDU was published in 2018 by Kgothatso Seshayi. The first KhiLovedu Novel, LEKHEKHESHA was published in 2018 by Eliya Monyela. The first KhiLovedu poetry book, ZWIRETO ZWA KHELOBEDU was published and launched in 2020 by KhiLovedu poet Makgwekgwe Waa-Mampeule. As of October 2021 a translation of the Christian Bible is being undertaken by VALODAGOMA SOCIETY (BaLobedu think tank) and PANSALB (Pan South African Languages Board).

The monarch associated with this language community is Queen Modjadji (also known as the Rain Queen). Lobedu is spoken by a majority of people in the Greater Tzaneen, Greater Letaba, and BaPhalaborwa municipalities, and a minority in Greater Giyani municipality, as well as in the Limpopo Province and Tembisa township in Gauteng. Its speakers are known as the Balobedu.

Sepulana exists in unwritten form and forms part of the standard Northern Sotho. Sepulana is spoken in Bushbuckridge area by the MaPulana people.

Northern Sotho is also spoken by the Mohlala people.

Writing system 
Sepedi is written in the Latin alphabet. The letter š is used to represent the sound [] ("sh" is used in the trigraph "tsh" to represent an aspirated ts sound). The circumflex accent can be added to the letters e and o to distinguish their different sounds, but it is mostly used in language reference books. Some word prefixes, especially in verbs, are written separately from the stem.

Phonology

Vowels

Consonants

Within nasal consonant compounds, the first nasal consonant sound is recognized as syllabic.

Urban varieties of Northern Sotho, such as Pretoria Sotho (actually a derivative of Tswana), have acquired clicks in an ongoing process of such sounds spreading from Nguni languages.

Vocabulary
Some examples of Sepedi words and phrases:

See also
Pedi people
Lebowa
Sekhukhuneland

Notes

External links 

 
 
Online Northern Sotho – English dictionary
Online Northern Sotho explanatory dictionary
Pan South African Language Board
 Audio files in Pedi at Wikimedia Commons

Software
 Spell checker for OpenOffice.org and Mozilla, OpenOffice.org, Mozilla Firefox web-browser, and Mozilla Thunderbird email program in Northern Sotho
 Translate.org.za Project to translate Free and Open Source Software into all the official languages of South Africa including Northern Sotho
 Keyboard with extra Northern Sotho characters

 
Sotho-Tswana languages
Languages of South Africa